Campiglossa dorema is a species of tephritid or fruit flies in the genus Campiglossa of the family Tephritidae.

Distribution
The species is found in China.

References

Tephritinae
Insects described in 1941
Diptera of Asia